Çöllolar  Coal Mine was a coal mine in Kahramanmaraş Province in Turkey which was destroyed in a landslide in 2011 with the loss of 10 lives. In 2019 it was tendered for sale.

References

External links 

 Çöllolar coal mine on Global Energy Monitor

Coal mines in Turkey
Kahramanmaraş Province
Coal mining disasters in Turkey
2011 disasters in Turkey